The 5th FINA World Junior Swimming Championships, were held on August 25–30, 2015, in Singapore. The championships were for girls born in the years 1998–2001 and boys born in 1997–2000.

Medal table

Medal summary

Boys' events

Girls' events

Mixed events

References

External links
 
 Event Information
 Results

J
Swimming in Singapore
International sports competitions hosted by Singapore
2015 in Singaporean sport
FINA World Junior Swimming Championships